The Lamar Lady Cardinals softball team represents Lamar University in NCAA Division I college softball.  The team participates in the Southland Conference. The Lady Cardinals are currently led by head coach Amy Hooks. The team played its home games at the off-campus Ford Park for the first two seasons following the program restart.  The Lady Cardinals began playing home games at the Lamar Softball Complex located on the university's campus starting with the 2015 season.

History
LU first sponsored softball from 1971 through 1977 competing in the AIAW. Lamar finished second in the 1972 AIAW Texas state tournament.  In addition to other head coaching duties, Pat Park was the Lady Cardinals head coach for the initial seasons.  Coach Park also served as women's head coach for basketball, tennis, and golf while she was at Lamar.

In 1983 Lamar added softball as an NCAA Division I sport and competed in the Southland conference. Tryouts for the team were held on October 16, 1982. The sport was dropped in 1987 when Lamar left the Southland Conference. Patty Calvert was head coach during the 1982-1987 period.

On April 22, 2011, Athletic Director Larry Tidwell announced plans to reinstate college softball as an NCAA Division I sport at Lamar University. On August 1, 2011 former Morehead State head coach Holly Bruder was announced as the finalist to fill the head coaching position at Lamar after over 20 years with no program at the university.  The Lady Cardinals finished fifth in the Southland Conference in their first season of competition (2012–13) following the restart of the program.  The team also earned a berth in the Southland Conference softball tournament.  Holly Bruder was removed as head coach on May 11, 2018.  On June 20, 2018, Amy Hooks was named as head coach for the team.

Off-campus Ford Park was the home field for the first two seasons after the program was restarted.  A new on-campus stadium was constructed in 2014-15.  On October 17, 2014, a ground breaking ceremony for the new Lamar Softball Complex was held.  The first game at the partially completed on-campus stadium was played on March 6, 2015 against the Houston Baptist Huskies.  The stadium was completed following the 2015 season.

NCAA Year-by-year results
Source:

(Results reflect games through May 11, 2022.)

Yearly attendance 
Below is the Lady Cardinals' home attendance since the 2012–13 restart of the program.

*Note:  Attendance restricted to 119 fans due to COVID19 precautions.
**Note:  Games after March 10, 2020 cancelled due to COVID19 precautions.
*** Note:  Temporary seating.
As of the 2021-20 season.

Post season appearances

National Invitational Softball Championship

The Lady Cardinals have participated in one national tournament, the inaugural National Invitational Softball Championship which started in 2017.  The team compiled a 6–3 record in that tournament losing to Liberty in the championship game.

Conference Tournaments
Sources:

Awards and honors 
Sources:

Southland Conference

All Conference First Team 
 Donna Dugas 1985, 87
 Teresa Fuxa 1986
 Tina Schulz 2014
 Bryn Baca 2016, '17
 Brittany Rodriguez 2016, '17
 Kendall Talley 2018
 Jade Lewis 2019

Hitter of the Year 
 Donna Dugas 1986

Newcomer of the Year 
 Laura Hall 1985
 Ciara Luna 2016
 Jade Lewis 2019

References

External links